Manuel Alejandro Siaca (born November 21, 1975) is a Puerto Rican boxer at super middleweight.

Siaca was born in Toa Baja, Puerto Rico, the son of Manny Siaca Sr., who was a noted boxing trainer and trained the likes of Edwin Rosario and Wilfredo Vazquez to world championships. He turned pro in 1997 and challenged Bruno Girard in 2000 for the WBA Super Middleweight Title, but lost a split decision. In 2001 he took on Byron Mitchell for the vacant WBA Super Middleweight Title.

Although Siaca was down in the 9th and 12th, he was leading in the fight but was stopped in the 12th. He challenged Mitchell later in the year and in a fight in which Siaca was down in the first and Mitchell was down in the 12th, Siaca lost a split decision.

In 2004 Siaca was able to capture a belt, winning the WBA Super Middleweight Title in an upset split decision victory over Anthony Mundine. He lost the title in his first defense to Mikkel Kessler, after Siaca remained in his corner after round 7.

In 2006 he moved up in weight and battled Silvio Branco for the interim WBA Light Heavyweight Title, but lost the decision.

See also 
 List of Puerto Rican boxing world champions

External links 
 

1975 births
Living people
People from Toa Baja, Puerto Rico
World boxing champions
Puerto Rican male boxers
Super-middleweight boxers